Anthony Fabiano (born July 13, 1993) is a scouting assistant for the Cleveland Browns and former American football center. He played college football at Harvard and was signed by the Baltimore Ravens as an undrafted free agent in 2016. He also played for the Cleveland Browns and Indianapolis Colts.

High school career
During high school, he played defensive end and tight end at Wakefield High School and was team captain his senior year. He also led his team with nine sacks, 57 tackles, and had 23 catches for 267 receiving yards. He was a two-year starter on the football team. He also played basketball at Wakefield High. 

During his junior year, he received an offer from Harvard after sending all the Ivy League schools game film. He also received an offer from Boston College but verbally committed to Harvard, solely based on academics, where he was elected a member of the Owl Club

College career
Fabiano began attending Harvard in 2012 as a freshman and played in 10 games at left tackle that season. He followed it up, playing in five games the next season in 2013. In 2014, he started all ten games at right guard and began generating interest from NFL scouts for his athletic ability and versatility. For his senior season, he was named to Reese's Senior bowl watch list and was likely on track for an invitation to the senior bowl after playing in seven games. On October 30, 2015, he suffered a major injury when he hyper extended his toe, partially tore a toe tendon, and fractured bone in his foot in a game against Dartmouth virtually ending his season and collegiate career.

Professional career

Pre-draft
Fabiano was scheduled to miss both the NFL scouting combine and Harvard's Pro Day due to a toe/foot injury he suffered in October. He used an ARP Wave Machine to accelerate the healing process and was able to begin training six weeks before Harvard's Pro Day. He was able to go through all the workouts and positional drills in front of scouts and representatives from 20 NFL teams. According to the Seattle Seahawks' SPARQ formula that evaluates a prospect's athletic ability, Fabiano was rated the most athletic offensive line prospect in the 2016 NFL Draft.

Baltimore Ravens
Fabiano signed with the Baltimore Ravens as an undrafted free agent on May 6, 2016. On August 29, 2016, he was released by the Ravens.

Cleveland Browns
On September 5, 2016, the Cleveland Browns signed Fabiano to their practice squad. He was promoted to the active roster on October 5. He was waived on October 10, and re-signed to the practice squad on October 12. On December 5, Fabiano was promoted to the active roster after injuries to John Greco, Joel Bitonio, and Austin Reiter. On September 2, 2017, Fabiano was waived by the Browns.

Washington Redskins
On September 4, 2017, Fabiano was signed to the Washington Redskins' practice squad. He was released on September 11, 2017.

New York Giants
On October 4, 2017, Fabiano was signed to the New York Giants' practice squad. He was released on October 10, 2017.

New England Patriots
On November 9, 2017, Fabiano was signed to the New England Patriots' practice squad, but was released two days later.

Indianapolis Colts
On November 28, 2017, Fabiano was signed to the Indianapolis Colts' practice squad. He was promoted to the active roster on December 2, 2017. He was waived by the Colts on May 14, 2018.

Cleveland Browns (second stint)
On May 15, 2018, Fabiano was claimed off waivers by the Cleveland Browns. He was waived on August 31, 2018.

Philadelphia Eagles
On November 20, 2018, Fabiano was signed to the Philadelphia Eagles practice squad.

Fabiano signed a reserve/future contract with the Eagles on January 14, 2019. He was waived during final roster cuts on August 30, 2019.

Tampa Bay Buccaneers
On October 16, 2019, Fabiano was signed to the Tampa Bay Buccaneers practice squad. He signed a reserve/future contract with the Buccaneers on December 30, 2019.

On September 5, 2020, Fabiano was waived by the Buccaneers.

Green Bay Packers
On December 8, 2020, Fabiano signed with the practice squad of the Green Bay Packers. On December 22, 2020, Fabiano was released.

Cleveland Browns (third stint)
On January 6, 2021, Fabiano was signed to the Cleveland Browns' active roster.

Executive career

Cleveland Browns
On June 6, 2021, Fabiano was hired by the Browns as a scouting assistant.

References

1993 births
Living people
People from Wakefield, Massachusetts
Sportspeople from Middlesex County, Massachusetts
Players of American football from Massachusetts
American football centers
Harvard Crimson football players
Baltimore Ravens players
Cleveland Browns players
Washington Redskins players
New York Giants players
New England Patriots players
Indianapolis Colts players
Philadelphia Eagles players
Tampa Bay Buccaneers players
Green Bay Packers players